Malcolm Cranstoun Welch was an Anglican priest in the Twentieth century.

Welch was educated at Christchurch College of Education. He was ordained deacon  and priest in 1961. After  a curacy at St Peter, Wellington he was the Chaplain at the city's hospital from 1964 to 1968. He was Vicar of Greymouth from 1964 to 1969; Archdeacon of Māwhera from 1975 until 1976; and then of Nelson from 1976.

References

20th-century New Zealand Anglican priests
Archdeacons of Māwhera
Archdeacons of Nelson
People educated at Christchurch College of Education
Christchurch College of Education alumni